My Depression: A Picture Book is a 2005 picture book written and illustrated by Elizabeth Swados about her experiences battling depression.

Reception
Donna Seaman wrote that "Swados' candid, seemingly simple tale conveys a wealth of helpful information and dispels the gloom a bit by making readers laugh." Christian Perring wrote that Swados "does give a clear sense of how disabling and awful it is to have depression", but called her drawings "very crude" and "amateurish".

Translations
The book has been translated to Chinese:
In People's Republic of China: 
In Taiwan:

Adaptations
The book was adapted into a 2014 animated television film My Depression (The Up and Down and Up of It). The short film was written and directed by Swados with Robert Marianetti and David Wachtenheim, and stars Sigourney Weaver as Liz.

References

2005 non-fiction books
Books about depression